Toddy Pictures Company was a film distribution and production company. It was founded by in 1941 by Ted Toddy (1900-1983) in a consolidation of his film businesses under the new name. The film company specialized in African-American films.

Toddy was born in Russia. He worked for more than a decade at major studios before establishing Dixie National Pictures in Atlanta. He was involved in efforts to distribute the 1936 film Polygamy which ran into censorship hurdles and Joseph Breen. He added Million Dollar Productions to his business in 1940. Toddy re-released Million Dollar Productions films with new titles and marketing.

Toddy marketed light comedies with outdoor scenes and plenty of musical performances to Black audiences.

Filmography
Harlem on the Prairie (1937), distributor of a Sack Amusements filmPolygamy (film) (1939), distributor for the Unusual Pictures filmUp Jumped the Devil (1940), a Dixie National Pictures productionPrison Bait (1940), a re-release of Reform School (film)His Harlem Wife (1941) a.k.a. Life Goes On (1938)Lucky Ghost (1942)Professor Creeps (1942)The Bronze Venus (1943), a re-release of the 1938 film The Duke Is Tops Fight That Ghost (1946)Buck and Bubbles Laugh JubileeGun Moll, also known as Gun SmashersFighting Americans, a war propaganda filmThe Return of Mandy's HusbandCrooked MoneyGoing to Glory Come to JesusMurder Rap (film)Mantan Messes UpEddie's Laugh JamboreeMr.Smith Goes GhostRacket Doctor, a re-release of Am I Guilty? (1940)What a GuyOne Round Jones (1946) a Sepia Production starring Eddie Green, originally released in 1940Mantan Runs for Mayor (1947)Come on Cowboy starring Mantan MorelandHouse-Rent Party (1946)Gangsters on the Loose, a re-issue of Bargain with Bullets''

References

External links
Ted Toddy Findagrave entry

Film distributors of the United States
Race films